WNUS (107.1 FM) is a radio station broadcasting a Country format. Licensed to Belpre, Ohio, United States, it serves the Parkersburg-Marietta area.  The station is currently owned by iHeartMedia, Inc.

External links
 

NUS
IHeartMedia radio stations